The 1986 Hillingdon Council election took place on 8 May 1986 to elect members of Hillingdon London Borough Council in London, England. The whole council was up for election and the council went into no overall control.

Background

Election result

Ward results

References

1986
1986 London Borough council elections